Frail is an album by Norwegian singer-songwriter Maria Solheim released in 2004 by Kirkelig Kulturverksted (FXCD 278).

Background 
This is Solheims third solo album release, including a collection of hushed and intense original songs. Here we encounter a more mature artist despite her 22 years of age.

Reception 
The reviewer Stein Østbø of the Norwegian newspaper Verdens Gang, awarded the album dice 4, reviewer Henriette Westerlund Eriksen of the Norwegian newspaper ABC Nyheter, awarded the album dice 4.

Track listing
(All songs and lyrics by Maria Solheim, arrangements by Emil, Maria and 'the band')
 Too Many Days
 The Snow Has Killed
 Kissing Me
 Take My Heart Away
 Mr. Iceman
 Pain
 Natural Silence
 Restless Girl
 Will You Say
 Because I'm Dead

Musicians
David Wallumrød: Fender Rhodes, vocals, Wurlitzer, Hammond
Torstein Lofthus: drums and percussion
Tor Egil Kreken: bass, Fender bass
Kjetil Steensnæs: guitars, pedalsteel
Carl Andreas Helsvig: Trombone
Mats Joachim Johnsen: Trumpet

Notes
Produced by Emil Nikolaisen
Recorded at Hangaroundsounds by Don Dons in June, August, September and October 2003
Mixed at Crystal Canyon by Marius Bodin Larsen
Additional recording at Crystal Canyon by Marius Bodin Larsen and Emil Nikolaisen in October and November 2003
Mastered at Cutting Room Studios by Björn Engelmann
Tor Egil uses Demeter amplification
Cover by Per Olav Walmann
Photos by Rebecca Borghild Nilsen and Maria Solheim

References

External links
Maria Solheim "Too many days" (original video) on YouTube

Maria Solheim albums
2004 albums